The Romance of Old Bill is a 1918 British silent comedy war directed by George Pearson and starring Charles Rock, Arthur Cleave and Hugh E. Wright. It was made at Twickenham Studios. It is based on the play The Better 'Ole, with the setting updated to the First World War.

Cast
 Charles Rock as Old Bill  
 Arthur Cleave as Bert  
 Hugh E. Wright as Alf  
 Mary Dibley as Maggie Busby 
 Hayford Hobbs as Jim 
 Lillian Hall-Davis as Lil  
 Alfred Phillips as Spy  
 Michelin Potous as Victoire  
 Marguerite Blanche as Suzette  
 J.M. Wright as Singer  
 Sid Jay as Juggler 
 Mansell Fane as Grouser  
 Frank Adair as Colonel  
 Meggie Albanesi as Waitress 
 Mercy Hatton 
 Micrommelynck as Colonel  
 Fernand Leone as Peasant

References

Bibliography
 Goble, Alan. The Complete Index to Literary Sources in Film. Walter de Gruyter, 1999.

External links

1918 films
1910s war comedy films
British silent feature films
British war comedy films
1910s English-language films
British World War I films
Films directed by George Pearson
Films shot at Twickenham Film Studios
British films based on plays
British black-and-white films
1918 comedy films
1910s British films
Silent war comedy films